Barricade is a clone of Blockade released by RamTeK in 1976. It is a two-player game of what would later be labelled snake.

See also
Bigfoot Bonkers
Dominos

External links

Barricade at Arcade History

1976 video games
Arcade video games
Arcade-only video games
Snake video games
Video games developed in the United States